Thonoknyu Assembly constituency is one of the 60 Legislative Assembly constituencies of Nagaland state in India.

It is part of Tuensang District and is reserved for candidates belonging to the Scheduled Tribes.

Members of the Legislative Assembly

Election results

2018

See also
 List of constituencies of the Nagaland Legislative Assembly
 Tuensang district

References

Tuensang district
Assembly constituencies of Nagaland